The 2011–12 Chicago Blackhawks season was the 86th season for the National Hockey League franchise that was established on September 25, 1926.

Off-season
On May 19, 2011, goaltender Corey Crawford signed a three-year, $8 million contract.

Regular season
On March 31, 2012, the Blackhawks clinched a playoff spot with a 5–4 victory over the Nashville Predators. This marks the Blackhawks fourth consecutive season making the playoffs.

Playoffs

The Blackhawks returned to the playoffs for the fourth straight season. The Blackhawks lost in the first round, losing to the Phoenix Coyotes in six games.

Standings

Schedule and results

Legend:

Pre-season

Regular season

Playoffs

This was the fourth consecutive season that the Blackhawks clinched a playoff berth.

Detailed records

Player statistics

Skaters

Goaltenders
Note: GP = Games played; Min = Minutes played; W = Wins; L = Losses; OT = Overtime losses; GA = Goals against; GAA= Goals against average; SA= Shots against; SV= Saves; Sv% = Save percentage; SO= Shutouts

†Denotes player spent time with another team before joining Blackhawks. Stats reflect time with the Blackhawks only.
‡Traded or released mid-season
Bold/italics denotes franchise record

Awards and records

Awards

Milestones

Transactions
The Blackhawks have been involved in the following transactions during the 2011–12 season.

Trades

Free agents acquired

Free agents lost

Claimed via waivers

Lost via waivers

Player signings

Draft picks 
Chicago's picks at the 2011 NHL Entry Draft in St. Paul, Minnesota.

See also 
 2011–12 NHL season

References

Chicago Blackhawks seasons
Chicago Blackhawks season, 2011-12
Chicago
Chic
Chic